The Eisner Award for Best Graphic Memoir is an award for "creative achievement" in non-fiction American comic books.

History
Up until 2020 memoirs were included in the category for Best Reality-Based Work, but in 2021 the judges created a new award as they felt there were too many high-quality non-fiction comics for one award.

Winners and nominees

References

Category
2006 establishments in the United States
Annual events in the United States
Awards established in 2006
Graphic Memoir